Acarviosin is a sugar composed of cyclohexitol linked to a 4-amino-4,6-dideoxy-D-glucopyranose. Acarviosin is part of the potent α-amylase inhibitor acarbose and its derivatives. Acarviosin is a product of the degradation of acarbose by gut microbiota, the glycoside hydrolase from gut bacteria Lactobacillus plantarum is able to hydrolyze acarbose to maltose and acarviosin. The nitrogen atom binds to α-amylase more tightly than the natural substrate making it more potent than other inhibitors. Several other acarviosin-containing α-amylase inhibitors have been found in microbes including isovalertatins  and butytatins  from Streptomyces luteogriseus and longer oligosaccharides from Streptomyces coelicoflavus.

References

Alpha-glucosidase inhibitors
Disaccharides
Amino sugars
Cyclitols
Cyclohexenes